Robert Wallace Strachan Hall (4 June 1939 – 17 June 2016) was a British Army officer, rising to the rank of brigadier. After leaving the service he became a Conservative politician and was the last Chairman of Wiltshire County Council, then the first to chair its successor authority, Wiltshire Council, from 2009 to 2012; he was also Chairman of the Wiltshire and Swindon Fire Authority. He retired from public life in 2013.

Early life
The son of Brigadier R. C. S. Hall CBE, late the Royal Regiment of Artillery (d. 1972), Hall was born at Aldershot and educated at Repton School and the Royal Military Academy Sandhurst.

Military career
Hall was commissioned into the Royal Regiment of Artillery as a 2nd Lieutenant on 25 July 1959. He was promoted to captain on 25 July 1965 and to major on 30 June 1971. He retired from the army as a brigadier on 1 March 1993.

During his army career, Hall attended the University of Cambridge and graduated M. Phil.

He went on to become Chairman of the Army and Navy Club, in Pall Mall, London. In retirement, he settled at Manningford Abbots, near Pewsey, Wiltshire.

Political career
Hall was elected to Wiltshire County Council as a Conservative at the elections in 2005. In 2008, he became the last chairman of the Council, which came to an end a year later with the 2009 structural changes to local government in England. He went on to become the first chairman of the successor authority Wiltshire Council, having been elected to it in 2009, representing Pewsey Vale. The same year he also became Chairman of Wiltshire Fire and Rescue Service. He retired as Chairman of Wiltshire Council in May 2012.

After 2009, Hall's Pewsey Vale electoral division included the parishes of Alton, Beechingstoke, Chirton, Charlton, Huish, Manningford, Marden, North Newnton, Patney, Rushall, Stanton St Bernard, Upavon, Wilcot, Wilsford and Woodborough.

As Chairman of the Wiltshire Fire Authority he hosted a visit by the Princess Royal to Salisbury on 10 March 2011.

He retired from public life at the 2013 Wiltshire Council election.

Honours
Appointed a Serving Brother of the Most Venerable Order of the Hospital of St John of Jerusalem, November 2003.

Private life
Hall took a keen interest in horse racing, and owned race-horses in the 1990s. He had a son, also Robert.

He died suddenly aged 77 at home on 17 June 2016, leaving a widow, children, and grandchildren.

See also

2005 Wiltshire County Council election
2009 Wiltshire Council election

Notes

External links
Cllr Brigadier Robert Hall at wiltshire.gov.uk

1939 births
2016 deaths
Alumni of the University of Cambridge
Royal Artillery officers
Conservative Party (UK) councillors
Councillors in South West England
People educated at Repton School
Graduates of the Royal Military Academy Sandhurst
Members of Wiltshire County Council
Members of Wiltshire Council